Francis Dade may refer to:
Francis L. Dade (c. 1793–1835), U.S. Army officer
Francis Dade (politician) (1621–1662), English-born Virginia politician and landowner

See also 
Frances Dade (1910–1968), American film actress